Tarabya of Pegu was the self-proclaimed king of Pegu (modern Bago, Myanmar) from  1287 to  1296. He was one of several regional strongmen who emerged after the fall of the Pagan Empire in 1287.

Initially, Tarabya was allied with Wareru, the strongman of the nearby Martaban province. But after their decisive victory over Pagan in 1295–1296, the alliance turned into an intense rivalry, which culminated in the two men fighting a duel on elephant-back about two years later. Tarabya was defeated, and after a brief stay in Martaban (Mottama), executed.

Background
Tarabya was originally a commoner by the name of Nga Pa-Mun (ငပမွန်), or A-Che-Mun (အချဲမွန်). His ascent to power was accidental. He was a brother-in-law of Akhamaman (also known as A-Kha-Mun), the self-proclaimed king of Pegu, who successfully revolted against King Narathihapate in 1285 during the Mongol invasions of the country. Two (or three) years later, Akhamaman was assassinated by his brother-in-law Lekkhaya Byu. In response, Ma Ta-Shauk (မတယှောက်), Akhamaman's and A-Che-Mun's father-in-law, recruited A-Che-Mun to eliminate the usurper. Eight days after the death of Akhamaman, A-Che-Mun assassinated Lekkhaya Byu. He declared himself king of Pegu with the title of Tarabya.

Reign

Consolidation of Pegu province
Tarabya came to power during anarchic times. No central authority had emerged after the assassination of the king by Prince Thihathu of Prome in July 1287. The Pagan Empire was no more; every region went its own way. At his accession, Tarabya controlled only around the town. To his west and south, he was still hemmed in by Prome (Pyay) and Dala–Twante, ruled by Pagan princes, Thihathu and Kyawswa, respectively. To his east, the Martaban (Mottama) province was controlled by another rebel Wareru. To his north, Thawun Gyi was in charge of Toungoo (Taungoo).

The frantic fighting among the sons of the fallen king gave petty rulers like Tarabya time to prepare. He reinforced Pegu's defenses while Thihathu fought his brothers Uzana of Bassein and Kyawswa throughout the Irrawaddy delta. By the time Thihathu attacked Pegu, Tarabya was well prepared to withstand a long siege. But Thihathu died in a freak accident during the siege, and Prome forces retreated. Soon after, Kyawswa left Dala for Pagan to become king. Tarabya quickly stepped in, and seized the entire Pegu province, including Dala, by the time Kyawswa emerged as king of Pagan on 30 May 1289.

War with Pagan
Initially, Tarabya saw no reason to acknowledge the new king at Pagan. Kyawswa had no real army, and the real power increasingly belonged to the three generals, who defeated the Mongol invasion into Central Burma in 1287. Tarabya was more concerned about the local rival next door: Wareru, who then controlled the Martaban province (present-day Mon State and southern Kayin State), and had the backing of the Tai-state of Sukhothai to the east. Nonetheless,  1293, he and Wareru entered into an alliance as a precaution against a Pagan invasion. In marriages of state, Tarabya married Wareru's daughter May Hnin Theindya while Wareru married Tarabya's daughter Shin Saw Hla.

The alliance was timely. Pagan's hand was forced in 1293 when Wareru received royal recognition and the gift of a white elephant from King Ram Khamhaeng of Sukhothai. In the dry season of 1295–1296 (also reported as 1293–1294), a sizable Pagan army led by Yazathingyan invaded to retake the entire southern coast. The army captured Dala and laid siege to Pegu. The city was starving when Wareru's troops from Martaban arrived and broke the siege. The combined Martaban–Pegu forces went on to dislodge the Pagan army from Dala, and drive the invaders out of the Irrawaddy delta.

The victory proved decisive. Neither Pagan nor its successor states would attempt a large scale invasion of the south for about another 90 years (until 1385).

Showdown with Wareru
With Pagan out of the picture, the rivalry between Tarabya and Wareru came back to the fore. The immediate point of contention was the control of the newly won Irrawaddy delta. It is unclear how they decided to rule the delta but the uneasy alliance lasted until late 1296, (The alliance overall lasted at least three years during which Tarabya and Wareru's daughter had two children.) The relationship deteriorated to the point of war. The two sides met at the border, and the two lords agreed to fight in single combat on their war elephants. Wareru defeated Tarabya in combat but spared Tarabya's life at the intercession of the monks. Wareru also appointed Laik-Gi, one of his ministers, governor of Pegu.

Death
Tarabya was brought to Martaban. His wife Theindya and their two young children also came. Soon after, he was found plotting an attempt on Wareru's life, and was executed. According to the Pak Lat Chronicles, it was Theindya who reported the plot to her father. But when her father ordered Tarabya's execution, she tied her tresses with his and dared executioners to cut off his head. It did not work; the executioners managed to cut his hair off, and beheaded him.

Aftermath
Tarabya's two young sons were brought up by Wareru. But the boys held a grudge against their grandfather for the father's death. In January 1307, they stabbed their unsuspecting grandfather to death. The boys were caught, and executed.

Notes

References

Bibliography
 
 
 
 
 
 
 
 
 
 
 
 
 

Hanthawaddy dynasty
1290s deaths